Brunswick Junction is a town in the South West of Western Australia, situated along the South Western Highway between Harvey and Bunbury. It had a population of 772 people at the 2016 census, down from 797 at the 2006 census.

History
The Aboriginal name for the Brunswick area is Mue-De-La.

The Brunswick River which runs just north of the town was surveyed by John Septimus Roe in 1830, and likely named by Governor Stirling after the Duke of Brunswick. Stirling was in command of HMS Brazen in 1813 when the ship was commissioned to take the Duke of Brunswick to Holland. The Duke was on the ship for five days.

The first farm in the area, "Alverstoke", started in 1842 by Marshall Clifton, was producing wheat, barley and potatoes within a few years. A bridge was built over the Brunswick River at Australind to give settlers in the area easier access to what was then the main community in the Harvey District.

In 1893, when the Perth-Bunbury railway was completed, no-one lived in the present-day townsite, but the Brunswick Farmers' Association was formed, with a post office and school operating nearby. In 1898, a junction was opened south of the river when the line to Collie opened, and a railway station was built.

The population of the town was 68 (38 males and 30 females) in 1898.

The town's centre underwent a significant upgrade in 2011 as part of the Royalties for Regions program, a dairy themed playground, landscaping and an underground power hub were all part of the 380,000 project that was opened by Brendon Grylls.

Present day
Brunswick Junction is mainly known today for dairying, to which a large Friesian cow (nicknamed Daisy) stands testament in a park in the centre of town. Peters Creameries produces milk products and cheese from nearby dairy farmers.

The town also hosts several historic buildings, including the shire hall, Catholic and Anglican churches and railway cottages, and the nearby Beela Valley has a scenic drive which takes in farming country east of the town as well as the Mornington forests.

The Brunswick Agricultural Show is one of the largest in regional Australia with over 15,000 visitors in October of each year. A fashion parade, trade exhibits, arts and crafts and flowers are among the things on offer.

Transport
In town, the South Western Highway carries the name Ommaney Road. Brunswick Junction is linked by road to Australind to the west via Clifton Road.

Railway junction
The town serves as a stop on the Australind passenger train from Perth to Bunbury on the South Western Railway.

It is a railway junction for the railway line from Collie, and the former railway branch lines that extended further east of Collie.

References

External links
 Town map of Brunswick Junction (Shire of Harvey)
 Brunswick Show

Towns in Western Australia
Shire of Harvey